Hodge is an unincorporated community in Lafayette County, in the U.S. state of Missouri.

History
An early variant name was Edward's Mill, after John Edward, the proprietor of a local gristmill. A post office called Hodge was established in 1888, and remained in operation until 1963.

References

Unincorporated communities in Lafayette County, Missouri
Unincorporated communities in Missouri